Plover is a city in Pocahontas County, Iowa, United States. The population was 50 at the time of the 2020 census.

History
Plover was platted in 1883, soon after the Des Moines and Fort Dodge Railroad was built through that territory. The railroad president named the town after the plover bird.

Geography
Plover is located at  (42.878058, -94.622648).

Demographics

2010 census
As of the census of 2010, there were 77 people, 34 households, and 20 families living in the city. The racial makeup of the city was 98.7% White and 1.3% from two or more races.

There were 34 households, of which 26.5% had children under the age of 18 living with them, 55.9% were married couples living together, 2.9% had a female householder with no husband present, and 41.2% were non-families. 38.2% of all households were made up of individuals, and 11.7% had someone living alone who was 65 years of age or older. The average household size was 2.26 and the average family size was 3.05.

The median age in the city was 46.3 years. 24.7% of residents were under the age of 18; 6.5% were between the ages of 18 and 24; 18.2% were from 25 to 44; 32.5% were from 45 to 64; and 18.2% were 65 years of age or older. The gender makeup of the city was 50.6% male and 49.4% female.

2000 census
As of the census of 2000, there were 95 people, 43 households, and 30 families living in the city. The racial makeup of the city was 97.89% White, 1.05% Asian, and 1.05% from two or more races.

There were 43 households, out of which 23.3% had children under the age of 18 living with them, 62.8% were married couples living together, 4.7% had a female householder with no husband present, and 30.2% were non-families. 30.2% of all households were made up of individuals, and 16.3% had someone living alone who was 65 years of age or older. The average household size was 2.21 and the average family size was 2.70.

In the city, the population was spread out, with 16.8% under the age of 18, 7.4% from 18 to 24, 21.1% from 25 to 44, 31.6% from 45 to 64, and 23.2% who were 65 years of age or older. The median age was 46 years. For every 100 females, there were 111.1 males. For every 100 females age 18 and over, there were 113.5 males.

The median income for a household in the city was $29,306, and the median income for a family was $30,625. Males had a median income of $25,750 versus $26,250 for females. The per capita income for the city was $15,241. There were 17.2% of families and 15.2% of the population living below the poverty line, including 46.7% of under eighteens and none of those over 64.

Education
Pocahontas Area Community School District operates public schools. It was in the Havelock-Plover Community School District until July 1, 1989, when it consolidated into the Pocahontas School District, resulting in the Pocahontas Area School District.

References

Cities in Pocahontas County, Iowa
Cities in Iowa